France competed at the 1980 Summer Paralympics in Arnhem, Netherlands. 97 competitors from France won 85 medals including 28 gold, 26 silver and 31 bronze and finished 8th in the medal table.

Medalists

See also 
 France at the Paralympics
 France at the 1980 Summer Olympics

References 

France at the Paralympics
1980 in French sport
Nations at the 1980 Summer Paralympics